A ghost note is a musical note with a rhythmic value, but no discernible pitch when played.

Ghost note may also refer to:
 Ghost-Note (band), a funk, hip-hop, and jazz band
 Ghost Notes, an album by Veruca Salt
 Ghost Notes (Vardøger album)

See also 
 The Ghost Note Symphonies, Vol. 1
 The Ghost Notebooks